St. Louis Church (Saanthiyago Church) is located in Mundamveli, Kochi in the Indian state of Kerala. It is 9 km from the Ernakulam Junction railway station and 42 km from Cochin International Airport. It is one of the oldest and most popular churches in Kerala and the 3rd Parish in Kochi, after Edakochi and Mattancherry.

History
The first church was originally constructed by the then  (Nestorian) Christians  near the Arabian Sea in the 9th century.

The church was dedicated to St. Mary. The church was located from south-west location of today's St. Michael's church Maanaassery. Today this place is popularly known as Maanaassery.

At that time there were only three parishes in Kochi: north-east side - Mattanchery Our Lady Of Life Church, east side -Edakochi St. Lawrence Church and Our Parish church in their rudimentary form..

In the 14th century the church was destroyed by sea erosion and still  under water.

In AD 1498 Portuguese missionaries  arrived in the land. There were Christians in Cochin at that time, not the present Syro -Malabar Christians. They were Nestorian Christians, who were converted by the Persian Bishops who came to Kerala before the Portuguese.Portuguese built a new church and they changed the name to "St. Louis" It was the second Parish church of Mundamveli.  During the time of Portuguese, the Roman Catholic Diocese of Cochin was erected under Padrovado as the second Catholic diocese in India after Goa in the year 1557. The Roman catholic church in its Latin rite was predominant at that time in Cochin and elsewhere under the Portuguese .

In the 17th century the church was again destroyed by the sea erosion.

In the 19th century another church was established near the Arabian Sea. But in 1808 it was burnt by the soldiers of the king of Kochi. After that incident, in 1850 parishioners built a small church in Cemetery. This is the fourth church. This church is presently used as the cemetery church. At that time the parish vicar was very confused about the continued flood and these kind of incidents and he was suffered how to overcome the situation. In his mind it was  very difficult to find a place to built a new church. At that time the government offered the land to build a new church in Mundamveli farm. The 5th parish church was inaugurated on 20 June 1868, as the fifth church.

In 1997, the church was renovated for its 130th anniversary. In earlier years St. Louis Parish was the biggest parish in Kochi. Later 1) Chellaanam St. Sebastians' (1832), 2) Thoppumpady St. Sebastian's (1833), 3) Maanaassery St. Michael's (1870), 4) Kannamaly St. Antony's (1873), 5) Cheriyakadavu St.Joseph's (1965), 6) Chirackal St.Joseph's (1968), 7) Kaattiparambu St. Francis Assisi's (1980), 8) Santhome St. Thomas (1990) parishes were separated from Mundamveli parish.

Festivals 

The biggest celebration of this church is the feast of St. Jacob (called Santhyapunnyalan by the people of Mundamveli), celebrated every 30 December. Thousands of believers coming from different parts of India

Other feasts celebrated include: 
 St. Sebastian - January, 2nd Sunday
 St. Francis Xavier - 1 May Sunday
 St. Francis of Assisi - 1 August Sunday
 St. Louis - 21 June
 Sacred Heart - June, last Sunday
 St. Jacob - 30 December
 Our Lady Of Nativity - 8 September
 Infant Jesus - October, 1st Sunday
 Our Lady of Presentation -  21 November
 St. Teresa - October 1

References

External links
 St.Louis Church – Mundamvely at catholicchurches.in

Rebuilt churches in India
Roman Catholic churches in Kochi
Mattancherry